Stanisław Zadora (born 3 October 1949 in Witoszów) is a Polish politician. He was elected to the Sejm on 25 September 2005, getting 6463 votes in 27 Bielsko-Biała district as a candidate from the League of Polish Families list.

He was also a member of Sejm 2001-2005.

See also
Members of Polish Sejm 2005-2007

External links
Stanisław Zadora - parliamentary page - includes declarations of interest, voting record, and transcripts of speeches.

1949 births
Living people
People from Świdnica County
Members of the Polish Sejm 2005–2007
Members of the Polish Sejm 2001–2005
League of Polish Families politicians